The Rue du Faubourg-Saint-Denis is a street in the 10th arrondissement of Paris. It crosses the arrondissement from north to south, linking the Porte Saint-Denis to La Chapelle Métro station and passing the Gare du Nord.

History
The Rue du Faubourg-Saint-Denis owes its name to the fact that it is an extension of the Rue Saint-Denis to the faubourg or area outside Paris's walls (as marked today by the Porte Saint-Denis). It also marked the eastern boundary of the enclos (later prison) Saint-Lazare.

Historically, this street was an extremely upper-class area, occupied by jewellers and textile merchants, since it was part of the King's processional route to the Basilica of Saint Denis. After the French Revolution the street briefly bore the name Rue du Faubourg Franciade in 1793 (with the portion between Rue Saint-Laurent and the Place de la Chapelle being renamed Rue du faubourg Saint-Lazare and Rue du faubourg de Gloire).

Length
From the Boulevard de Bonne-Nouvelle to Boulevard de Magenta: 850 m 
Between the Boulevard de Magenta and Rue Cail: 520m 
From Rue Cail to the Boulevard de la Chapelle: 300 m

Points of interest
 On 19 August 1848 the street was the birthplace of painter Gustave Caillebotte
 Mistinguett, who made this street famous by singing "je suis née dans le faubourg saint-Denis", was actually born in Enghien-les-bains.
 The "marchandes de quatre saisons" (The merchants [street vendors] of the Four Seasons) were typical of this street.  They can be seen in the 1961 Jean-Luc Godard film Une femme est une femme, but have since been removed because they were causing traffic congestion.
 An old Bouillon snackbar has become a fashionable brasserie, Bouillon Julien, well-known across Paris for its profiteroles (a pastry). 
 A fashionable 'traiteur', Julhès (formerly Royal-Cabello, founded by Henri Lacour, then by M. Mauduit), known for its mille-feuilles (also a pastry).
 The training gymnasium of Marcel Cerdan is at number 23, and the "Central sporting club  de Boxe", featured in a scene from the 1954 film, L'Air de Paris, is at number 57.
 The Reggiani family hairdressers' shop was at number 83; Serge Reggiani evoked the spirit of this street in an autobiographical song.

Connecting streets
 Passage Prado, known for its Art déco decoration
 Passage Brady, known for its Indian and Pakistani restaurants
 Passage de l'Industrie

External links